Ali, the Goat and Ibrahim (transliterated: Ali Mizah wa Ibrahim) is a 2016 Egyptian film directed by Sherif El Bendary.

Plot 
Ali believes his late girlfriend's soul has been reincarnated in a goat named Nada. Ali, his goat and his friend Ibrahim embark on a journey of friendship and self-discovery across Egypt to reverse the curse.

Cast 
 Ali Subhi – Ali
 Ahmed Magdy – Ibrahim
 Salwa Mohamed Ali – Nousa
 Nahed El Sebai – Sabah
 Ibrahim Ghareib – The train collector

Reception 
The film was dubbed "a weirdly likable firecracker" in a review in The Hollywood Reporter. It received a mostly positive review in the Variety. It won the award for Best feature film at the 2017 Malmö Arab Film Festival.

Awards
 Best Feature Film, Malmö Arab Film Festival
 Best Actor, Dubai International Film Festival

References

External links
 
 
 Ali, the Goat and Ibrahim on elcinema.com

2016 films
Egyptian fantasy films
2010s Arabic-language films
Malmö Arab Film Festival winners
Egyptian drama films